United Nations Security Council resolution 849, adopted unanimously on 9 July 1993, after noting with concern the recent fighting around Sukhumi in the disputed region of Abkhazia, the Council requested the Secretary-General Boutros Boutros-Ghali to send his Special Envoy to the region in order to reach agreement for a ceasefire between Abkhazia and Georgia, and once implemented, authorised a dispatch of 50 military observers. It was the first Security Council resolution on the conflict.

The Secretary-General was also requested to make recommendations on the mandate of the military observers, while his efforts to launch a peace process involving Abkhazia, Georgia along with Russia as a facilitator and continuing co-operation with the Chairman-in-Office of the Organization for Security and Co-operation in Europe were supported. Finally, the Government of Georgia was requested to enter into discussions with the United Nations on a Status of Forces Agreement to facilitate early deployment of observers.

See also
 Georgian–Abkhazian conflict
 List of United Nations Security Council Resolutions 801 to 900 (1993–1994)
 Sukhumi massacre
 United Nations Observer Mission in Georgia
 United Nations resolutions on Abkhazia
 War in Abkhazia (1992–1993)

References

External links
 
Text of the Resolution at undocs.org

 0849
Abkhaz–Georgian conflict
1993 in Georgia (country)
1993 in Abkhazia
 0849
July 1993 events